The following is a list of active equipment of the Pakistan Army.

Infantry weapons

Small arms

Explosives, rockets, mortars and mines

Land vehicles

Main battle tanks

Armoured combat vehicles

Utility vehicles

Goods & troops transport vehicles

Engineering and support vehicles

Artillery

Missile systems

Anti-tank guided missiles

Air defence

Radars

Aircraft

 In 2015 the Pakistan Army ordered 12 Bell AH-Z Viper attack helicopters, with an option of 3 more to replace its aging AH-1F Cobras. Following cancellation of $300 million military aid to Pakistan by the US government, the helicopters were put into storage at Davis-Monthan AFB, Arizona.
 3 CAIC Z-10 attack helicopters of China were delivered for trial use so that orders could be made in the future. However, as of 2018, no orders have been made further and replaced by TAI/AgustaWestland T129 ATAK, this could mean that these 3 helicopters were returned with no follow-up order.
 In 2018, following trials, Pakistan ordered 30 T129 ATAK helicopters from TAI. Following US reluctance to grant Turkey the necessary export licenses for the LHTEC CTS800-4A engines, Pakistan extended the delivery deadline by 1 year.

Unmanned aerial vehicles

See also
Pakistan Army Aviation Corps
Currently active military equipment by country

References

Army
Pakistan Army
Equipment
Pakistan Army